Carroll Township is one of the twelve townships of Ottawa County, Ohio, United States.  The 2000 census found 1,913 people in the township.

Geography
Located in the northern part of the county along Lake Erie, it borders the following townships:
Put-in-Bay Township - northeast, across Lake Erie
Erie Township - southeast
Salem Township - south
Benton Township - west
Jerusalem Township, Lucas County - northwest

No municipalities are located in Carroll Township.

Carroll Township also houses the Magee Marsh State Reservation and Davis-Besse Nuclear Power Station.

Name and history
It is the only Carroll Township statewide.

Government
The township is governed by a three-member board of trustees, who are elected in November of odd-numbered years to a four-year term beginning on the following January 1. Two are elected in the year after the presidential election and one is elected in the year before it. There is also an elected township fiscal officer, who serves a four-year term beginning on April 1 of the year after the election, which is held in November of the year before the presidential election. Vacancies in the fiscal officership or on the board of trustees are filled by the remaining trustees.

References

External links
Township website
County website

Townships in Ottawa County, Ohio
Townships in Ohio